The First Battle of Ream's Station was fought on June 29, 1864, during the Wilson–Kautz Raid of the American Civil War. Confederate forces under Maj. Gen. William Mahone and Brig. Gen. Fitzhugh Lee defeated Union cavalry raiding Confederate railroads south of Petersburg, Virginia.

Background
In June 1864, a Union division under the command of Brig. Gen. August V. Kautz moved into southern Virginia where they began destroying sections of the Wilmington and Weldon Railroad as part of the Richmond-Petersburg Campaign. On June 29 the division reached Ream's Station south of Petersburg on the Weldon Railroad, which was thought to be held by Union infantry. Instead, Kautz found the road barred by Mahone's Confederate infantry division. Wilson's division, fighting against elements of Maj. Gen. W.H.F. "Rooney" Lee's cavalry, joined Kautz's near Ream's Station, where they were virtually surrounded.

Battle

Around noon, Mahone led Confederate infantry against the Union front while cavalry under Fitzhugh Lee attacked the Union left flank. The fierce assault split the Union forces. Wilson and Kautz were forced to withdraw quickly, burning their supply wagons and abandoning their artillery.

Separated by the Confederate attacks, Wilson and his men cut their way through and retreated southwest on the Stage Road to cross the Nottoway River, while Kautz headed south and east cross-country, reaching Federal lines at Petersburg about dark. Wilson continued east to the Blackwater River before turning north, eventually reaching Union lines at Light House Point on July 2.

Battlefield preservation
The American Battlefield Trust and its partners have acquired and preserved  of the fields of battle at Ream's Station through November 2021.

See also
 Second Battle of Ream's Station
 Battles of the American Civil War
 Bibliography of Ulysses S. Grant
 Bibliography of the American Civil War

Notes

References
National Park Service battle description
 CWSAC Report Update

Further reading
 Linedecker, Clifford L., ed. Civil War, A-Z: The Complete Handbook of America's Bloodiest Conflict. New York: Ballantine Books, 2002. .

Ream's Station I
Ream's Station I
Ream's Station I
Ream's Station I
Ream's Station
Ream's Station
1864 in Virginia
June 1864 events